Ken J. Mascara (born July 8, 1958) is the Sheriff of St. Lucie County, Florida, United States, and is the elected top official of the St. Lucie County Sheriff's Office, one of the largest law enforcement agencies on the Treasure Coast of Florida. Ken J. Mascara is the nephew of former congressman Frank R. Mascara, a Democratic politician from Pennsylvania who served four terms in the United States House of Representatives from 1995 to 2003. Ken Mascara is also a Democrat. First elected in 2000, Mascara is serving his sixth term as sheriff.

Biography 
Ken J. Mascara was born on July 8, 1958, in Hollywood, Florida.
His educational background includes an Associate of Arts/Associate of Science degree at Indian River State College; Doctor of Chiropractic degree at Life University. He is a graduate of the Executive Development Seminar at the FBI Academy and a graduate of the National Executive Institute at the FBI Academy.

Awards 
Ken J. Mascara has received a number of awards for his service to his community and profession. He was the 1988 Citizen of the Year. He was the Law Enforcement Officer of the Year in 2002 and 2004, and received the 2002 Distinguished Citizen Award, Boy Scouts of America Gulf Stream Council.

References

External links 
 Biography at St. Lucie's Sheriff's Office

1958 births
Living people
People from St. Lucie County, Florida
People from Hollywood, Florida
Florida Democrats
Florida sheriffs